Shafqat Emmanuel and Shagufta Kausar are a Pakistani Christian couple who in 2014 were convicted of blasphemy by a Pakistani court, receiving a sentence of death by hanging. In 2021, the convictions were overturned.

The couple
Married couple Shafqat Emmanuel and Shagufta Kausar were living in poverty with their four children in a mission compound of Gojra Church in Toba Tek Singh District in Punjab, Pakistan. Kausar was the only working person in the family. Emmanuel was confined to a wheelchair, due to an accident in 2004 that resulted him in suffering a spinal injury, causing him to be paralyzed below the chest. According to Shagufta, the injury was caused by a stray bullet that hit him as he was trying to break up a fight.

Prosecution
In July 2013, Emmanuel and Kausar were arrested for sending a text message that was deemed blasphemous against the Islamic prophet Muhammad. In an interview with Aid to the Church in Need, Shagufta claimed that they were tortured in prison. "In jail, we were tortured. The officers told my husband that if he did not confess, they would rape me in front of him, and so he confessed, even though we were both innocent."

On 4 April 2014, the illiterate couple were given death sentences for sending the message in English. Despite the couple being illiterate, the additional session judge of Toba Tek Singh sentenced them death on 4 April 2014.  They are the first Pakistani couple to have been given the death sentence for blasphemy. The couple said that the complainants’ lawyers kept proclaiming Koranic references that called for death to blasphemers. Even the prosecuting attorneys told the judge that if he will not give them death sentence, they would be ready to become ghazi (Muslim warriors), like Ilm-ud-din and Mumtaz Qadri. Due to the high risk to the couple's security, the whole trial was concluded inside the boundary walls of the prison. The couple were defended by the Farrukh Saif Foundation and their Partner Emergency Rescue Committee since 2013, who filed the appeal in the Apex Court against the death sentence. According to Shagufta, neither she nor her husband were allowed to testify, and their lawyers were not allowed to make their closing arguments.

While on death row, Shagufta was offered the possibility of converting and having her sentence commuted. "Several times I was told that if I converted to Islam my death sentence would be turned into life in prison, and that eventually I would be released. I always said no", she claimed, in an interview with Aid to the Church in Need. At one point she was held in a cell next to Asia Bibi. "For a while Asia Bibi, who was also sentenced to death on false charges of blasphemy, was my neighbour on death row in Multan. Whenever we met, we used to pray together, console each other and renew our firm faith in Jesus Christ. At Christmas time we would share cake with other Muslim and Christian prisoners. When I heard that Asia was set free, my heart was filled with joy, and I was convinced that one day I too would be released".

Appeal against the death sentence
On 8 April 2014, the Farrukh Saif Foundation filed appeal against the death sentence of Emmanuel and Kausar. On 3 June 2021, the Lahore High Court overturned the convictions due to lack of evidence. The couple were unable to remain in Pakistan, due to lack of safety, and were given asylum in a European country.

References

2014 in Punjab, Pakistan
2021 in Punjab, Pakistan
2010s in Lahore
2020s in Lahore
Blasphemy law in Pakistan
Capital punishment in Pakistan
Persecution of Christians by Muslims
Persecution of Christians in Pakistan
Overturned convictions in Pakistan